British Theatre are an English band from Manchester, formed in 2011 by former Oceansize members and current Biffy Clyro touring musicians, Mike Vennart and Richard "Gambler" Ingram. The duo released an untitled EP on 25 February 2012, exactly one year on from their former band's break-up.

On 20 August 2012, the band released its second EP, Dyed in the Wool Ghost, as a digital download and on 12-inch vinyl.

In April 2016, their debut album Mastery was released.

Discography
EP (25 February 2012)
Dyed in the Wool Ghost (20 August 2012)
Mastery (2016)

References

External links
British Theatre
British Theatre Bandcamp

Musical groups from Manchester
Musical groups established in 2011
2011 establishments in England